John Thomas Mateer (born December 4, 1995), is an American musician, filmmaker, and entertainment entrepreneur. He grew up in Wantagh, New York. Mateer was an early-era content creator on YouTube in the late 2000s, and his first media appearances resulted from the viral content that he created on the platform. Shifting his focus towards music at the beginning of the 2010s, Mateer released his first extended play, Love is Not a Lifestyle, in the summer of 2011. Mateer has confessed to regretting making the EP altogether, causing him to take a decade-long hiatus from making music. Mateer’s entrepreneurial endeavors most notably include the founding and operation of the post-production company, RIOT MOTION LLC. The company operates out of the East Village in New York City. He also started the nonprofit organization, Empathy Always Corp., which provides relief to victims of narcissistic abuse. Mateer writes both screenplays and poetry professionally as well. His first published collection of poetry, The Flight of a Monarch: Poetry From Young Adulthood, releases in spring 2023.

Early life
John Thomas Mateer was born on December 4, 1995, in the village of Mineola, New York, to parents Carol and John Mateer. He was raised in the Long Island hamlet of Wantagh, New York, along with his three siblings Erin, Bryan and Kelly. In July 2003, when Mateer was 7-years-old, his mother died at the age of 39 from cancer. In December 2012, less than a decade later, his father succumbed to the same illness. Mateer’s father was a Detective Sergeant with the Nassau County Police Department and a 9/11 first responder.  The death of Detective Sgt John Mateer is acknowledged by multiple associations dedicated to first responder relief as being the result of 9/11-related cancer, after having been exposed to the contaminated air at the World Trade Center site. Mateer graduated from Wantagh Senior High School in 2014. He went on to attend both CUNY Queens College in Kew Gardens Hills, Queens and CUNY Hunter College in nearby Manhattan, New York.

Early media appearances
 Mateer first appeared on YouTube in the late 2000s. In 2009, Mateer collaborated with singer-songwriter Charlie Puth on the theme song, Have No Fear It's John Mateer, for his YouTube channel. Mateer has since left the platform. In October 2012, at the age of 16, Mateer recorded a video of the destruction to his home in Long Island during Hurricane Sandy. The video immediately attracted large amounts of attention, amassing over one-million views on YouTube. Despite Mateer’s video documenting the devastating effects of the natural disaster, it was most widely noted for its unintentional comedic value due to Mateer and his family's off-screen commentary. During a televised interview of Mateer by Katie Couric for her talk show, Katie, Couric described the video as "a terrifying situation.." following lightheartedly with, ".. but I do like your color commentary!" Mateer’s video received global attention and subsequently found him featured in numerous television shows and documentaries. Some had declared Mateer the "next double rainbow guy." . In June 2013, Mateer and his two sisters were featured in an episode of Long Island Medium, where they had a Psychic reading by Theresa Caputo. In the episode, Caputo claimed to be connecting Mateer and his sisters with their parents, both of whom died from cancer. The reading was described by TLC as "one of the most powerful readings that Theresa has ever done." Caputo went on to write about her encounter with Mateer and his sisters in her book, There's More to Life Than This.

Career
 Mateer is a member of the Motion Picture Editors Guild. In May 2021, Mateer filed to incorporate his post-production company, RIOT MOTION LLC, which he is the Chief Executive Officer of. The company operates out of the East Village of Manhattan. In August 2022, Mateer began releasing a scripted audio drama entitled John Mateer's 'METRONOME'''. The show is loosely defined as a dark comedy, covering topics related to personality disorders and emotional abuse. Mateer writes and directs the series, which has a full cast of actors, as well as provides the voice for the show's protagonist. In September that year, more than a decade after last releasing music, Mateer released a single entitled Here’s To Next Year. The song has since been removed from streaming services for unknown reasons. In November, Mateer released two singles entitled St Marks Pl and Blue Era, the latter of the two surpassing 150,000 streams on Spotify less than a month after its release. These songs were followed by a single released in December of 2022 entitled Saulet. The three singles are included in the album entitled Outlandish, which was released at the end of 2022. In January 2023, Mateer announced on his website that a subsidiary of RIOT MOTION LLC specializing in virtual reality, Vizsy Technologies, was in the beginning stages of development. In February 2023, Mateer announced the formation of his nonprofit organization, Empathy Always Corp. The mission of the organization is to provide relief to victims of domestic violence and narcissistic abuse. Mateer’s first published collection of poetry is scheduled to release in the spring of 2023, and it will be distributed exclusively by Barnes & Noble.

Personal life
Mateer was raised in the suburban hamlet of Wantagh in Long Island, New York, where he attended Wantagh Senior High School. He is Irish-American. Mateer has been openly gay ever since coming out in 2010 at the age of 14, and he has described his coming out as having been a positive experience for him. When coming out to his family, he found himself unable to speak  when telling his father, so he decided to write him a letter instead. Mateer is a resident of the famous Saint Marks Place in New York City, and this is where his pseudonym, Johnny Saint Marks, originated from. He is the cousin of former New York Stock Exchange Chief Executive Officer, Richard Grasso.

Penn State University assault
On the 4th of October 2015, during a fraternity party at the Penn State University Sigma Nu house, Mateer was assaulted by a fellow party-goer after Mateer revealed he was gay. Mateer did not initially report the crime to the police, opting instead to post photos of his injuries on his Twitter page. Along with the photos, Mateer included the statement, "''Don’t let a frat guy know that you’re gay," and the Twitter post quickly went viral. Others online began to write on platforms, such as Facebook, detailing their dissatisfaction with how news outlets were reporting on Mateer's assault. Two days following the incident, and likely due to the increasing public upset over Mateer's assault, Penn State University issued an official statement condemning the attack and wishing Mateer well during his recovery.

Despite Mateer's initial claims, Matthew Chandlee (his attacker), was not a member of the Sigma Nu fraternity. However, Chandlee being charged with summary harassment and simple assault (both misdemeanors) instead of a hate crime, caused major controversy online. The ensuing backlash stemmed mainly from the state of Pennsylvania’s lack of protection of LGBT people under their hate crime laws, and the case started a national conversation surrounding the issue.

Discography

Albums

Singles

Filmography

Film 

As cinematographer:

As himself:
{| class="wikitable sortable plainrowheaders"
|-
! Year
! Title
! Credit
! Notes
! Refs
|-
! scoperow= rowspan="3"| 2012
| Superstorm New York: What Really Happened
| rowspan="3"| Himself
| rowspan="3"| TV Movie
|
|-
| Superstorm 2012
|
|-
| Superstorm USA: Caught on Camera 
|
|-
|}

As actor:

Television 

As himself:
{| class="wikitable sortable plainrowheaders"
|-
! Year
! Country
! Title
! Notes
! Refs
|-
! scoperow=| 1999
| rowspan="6"| United States
| Zebby’s Zoo
| Cast member
| 
|-
! scoperow=| 2003
| Crossing Over With John Edward
| Episode: A Mother’s Passing; Syfy
|
|- 
! scoperow= rowspan="2"| 2013
| Weather Caught on Camera
| Episode: Sailboat Survival
|
|-
| Long Island Medium
| Season 4, Episode 12: Bouffants and Bingo
|
|-
! scoperow= rowspan="2"| 2012
| 20/20
| The Year With Katie Couric
|
|-
| Katie
| Guest, Episode: Stories of Triumph Over Tragedy
|
|-
|}

Podcasts

Bibliography

References

External links

Jaxsta catalogue

Publicity
RIOT MOTION LLC • (NYSDOS)
Empathy Always Corp • (NYSDOS)

21st-century LGBT people
American electronic musicians
Gay singers
Gay songwriters
LGBT people from New York (state)
American gay musicians
American LGBT singers
American LGBT songwriters
Living people
Singers from New York City
Songwriters from New York (state)
Synth-pop singers
Experimental musicians
Pop musicians
Comedy musicians
Filmmakers from New York (state)
American gay writers
1995 births